Receptor activator of nuclear factor kappa- ligand (RANKL), also known as tumor necrosis factor ligand superfamily member 11 (TNFSF11), TNF-related activation-induced cytokine (TRANCE), osteoprotegerin ligand (OPGL), and osteoclast differentiation factor (ODF), is a protein that in humans is encoded by the TNFSF11 gene.

RANKL is known as a type II membrane protein and is a member of the tumor necrosis factor (TNF) superfamily.  RANKL has been identified to affect the immune system and control bone regeneration and remodeling. RANKL is an apoptosis regulator gene, a binding partner of osteoprotegerin (OPG), a ligand for the receptor RANK and controls cell proliferation by modifying protein levels of Id4, Id2 and cyclin D1. RANKL is expressed in several tissues and organs including: skeletal muscle, thymus, liver, colon, small intestine, adrenal gland, osteoblast, mammary gland epithelial cells, prostate and pancreas. Variation in concentration levels of RANKL throughout several organs reconfirms the importance of RANKL in tissue growth (particularly bone growth) and immune functions within the body.

Tissue expression 
The level of RANKL expression does not linearly correlate to the effect of this ligand. High protein expression of RANKL is commonly detected in the lungs, thymus and lymph nodes.  Low protein expression is found in bone marrow, the stomach, peripheral blood, the spleen, the placenta, leukocytes, the heart, the thyroid, and skeletal muscle. While bone marrow expresses low levels of RANKL, RANKL plays a critical role for adequate bone metabolism. This surface-bound molecule (also known as CD254), found on osteoblasts, serves to activate osteoclasts, which are critically involved in bone resorption.  Osteoclastic activity is triggered via the osteoblasts' surface-bound RANKL activating the osteoclasts' surface-bound receptor activator of nuclear factor kappa-B (RANK). Recent studies suggest that in postnatal bones, the osteocyte is the major source of RANKL regulating bone remodeling. RANKL derived from other cell types contributes to bone loss in conditions involving inflammation such as rheumatoid arthritis, and in lytic lesions caused by cancer, such as in multiple myeloma.

Gene and expression 
RANKL can be expressed in three different molecular forms consisting of either a: (1) trimeric transmembrane protein, (2) primary secreted form, and (3) truncated ectodomain. RANKL is identified as a part of the TNF family; RANKL is specifically categorized under the TNFSF11, the TNF ligand superfamily member. RANKL is composed of 314 amino acids and was originally described to have a gene sequence containing 5 exons. Among the exons, Exon 1 encoded the intracellular and transmembrane protein domains and Exon 2-5 encoded the extracellular domains. RANKL’s extracellular domains are similar to other TNF family members in regards to the structural homology and are able to cleave from the cell surface. While the function and significance of A kinase anchor protein 11(AKAP11) is presently unknown, AKAP11 is immediately upstream from RANKL for all species that has a RANKL gene. The upstream of AKAP11 may suggest there is a complex regulator process that regulates the level of RANKL expression.

Function 
RANKL is a member of the tumor necrosis factor (TNF) cytokine family. It binds to RANK on cells of the myeloid lineage and functions as a key factor for osteoclast differentiation and activation. RANKL may also bind to osteoprotegerin, a protein secreted mainly by cells of the osteoblast lineage which is a potent inhibitor of osteoclast formation by preventing binding of RANKL to RANK.  RANKL also has a function in the immune system, where it is expressed by T helper cells and is thought to be involved in dendritic cell maturation.  It is a dendritic cell survival factor and helps regulate T cell-dependent immune responses. T cell activation induces RANKL expression and can lead to an increase of osteoclastogenesis and bone loss. RANKL can also activate the antiapoptotic kinase AKT/PKB through a signaling complex involving SRC kinase and tumor necrosis factor receptor-associated factor 6 (TRAF6), indicating that RANKL may have a role in the regulation of apoptosis.  A further role for RANKL in immunity was found in sinusoidal macrophages in lymph nodes that alert the immune system to lymph-borne antigens. In addition to directly signaling through RANK for macrophage differentiation, RANKL activates the adjacent lymphatic endothelial cells to create a niche environment for these specialized immune cells.

Animal models 
Targeted disruption of the related gene in mice led to severe osteopetrosis and a lack of osteoclasts. Deficient mice, with an inactivation of RANKL or its receptor RANK, exhibited defects in early differentiation of T and B lymphocytes, and failed to form lobulo-alveolar mammary structures during pregnancy.
It was observed that during pregnancy, RANK-RANKL signaling played a critical role in regulating skeletal calcium release; in which contributed to the hormone response that stimulated proliferation in the mammary cells. Ultimately, impaired lobuloalveolar mammary structures resulted in death of the fetus. Those who suffer from osteoporosis often have a cardiovascular defect, such as heart failure. Some studies suggest, since RANK-RANKL pathway regulates calcium release and homeostasis, RANK-RANKL signal could invertedly affect the cardiovascular system; thus, an explanation for the positive correlation between osteoporosis and cardiovascular deficiencies.

Role in cancer 
Primary tumors will commonly metastasize into the bone. Breast and prostate cancers typically have a greater chance of inducing secondary cancers within bone. Stephen Paget's seed and soil theory suggests, the microenvironment in bone creates a sufficient ‘soil’ for secondary tumors to grow in. Some studies suggest the expression of RANKL allows sufficient micro environmental conditions to influence cancer cell migration (i.e. chronic lymphocytic leukemia (CLL) and multiple myeloma). Among patients with multiple myeloma, RANKL activity was greatly increased. In fact RANKL surface expression and secreted RANKL expression was reported to be increased, 80% and 50% respectively. Therefore, RANKL is considered to be a key signal regulator for cancer-induced bone loss.

According to the vicious cycle hypothesis, after secondary tumors cells have migrated to bone, the tumor cell will secrete cytokines and growth factors that can act on osteoblast lineage cells. Since osteoblasts control the regulation of RANKL, the stimulation via cytokines and growth factors will then stimulate osteoblasts to increase the expression of RANKL, often while simultaneously reducing bone formation. The additional RANKL-mediated osteoclast frequency and activity will in turn increase secretion of growth factors, or matrix derived factors, which can ultimately increase tumor growth and bone destruction activity.

Clinical significance 
RANKL, through its ability to stimulate osteoclast formation and activity, is a critical mediator of bone resorption and overall bone density. Overproduction of RANKL is implicated in a variety of degenerative bone diseases, such as rheumatoid arthritis and psoriatic arthritis. In addition to degenerative bone diseases, bone metastases can also induce pain and other abnormal health complexities that can significantly reduce a cancer patient’s quality of life. Some examples of these complications that are a consequence of bone metastasis are: hypercalcemia, pathological fractures and spinal cord compression. Some findings also suggest that some cancer cells, particularly prostate cancer cells, can activate an increase in bone remodeling and ultimately increase overall bone production. This increase in bone remodeling and bone production increases the overall growth of bone metastasizes. The overall control of bone remodeling is regulated by the binding of RANKL with its receptor or its decoy receptor, respectively, RANK and OPG.

Denosumab 

Denosumab is an FDA-approved fully human monoclonal antibody to RANKL and during pre-clinical trials was first used to treat postmenopausal patients suffering with osteoporosis (PMO). In denosumab's third stage of the FDA's clinical trial, it was shown to: (1) decrease bone turnover, (2) reduce fractures in the PMO population, and (3) increase bone mineral density. The anti-RANKL antibody, denosumab, is also approved for use in cancer settings, and in those indications, it is branded as Xgeva. In both prostate and breast cancer, denosumab has been shown to reduce cancer treatment–induced bone loss.

Prostate cancer 
The HALT-prostate cancer trial (also known as NCT00089674) included 1468 non-metastatic prostate cancer patients who were currently receiving androgen deprivation therapy. Randomly selected patients were given either 60 mg of denosumab or calcium and vitamin D supplements. This was done to measure the effectiveness of preventing treatment-induced bone loss. The patients who received 60 mg of denosumab showed a +5.6% increased in bone mineral density and a 1.5% decrease in bone fracture rates.

Another clinical trial (NCT00321620) was established to determine the safety and effectiveness of using denosumab compared to zoledronic acid. In this trial, they used 1901 bone metastatic prostate patients whom were also suffering with other complication of bone diseases. Again, patients were randomized and some were given either 120 mg of denosumab or 4 mg of zoledronic acid. Patients who were given 120 mg of denosumab (in comparison to those who were given 4 mg of zoledronic acid) showed a greater increase in hypocalcemia, a greater resistance to bone turnover markers uNTx, a delay response in both pathological fractures and spinal cord compression. However, survival rates for both clinical groups were comparable.

Breast cancer 
Hormone receptor positive breast cancer patients have a significant increased risk of complications such as osteopenia and osteoporosis. About two out of every three breast cancer patients are hormone receptor positive. In the past several years, denosumab has been used in clinical trials, primarily because a large population is affected by bone complication among those who have breast cancer.

252 patients enlisted in the HALT-BC clinical trial (also known as NCT00089661). In addition to receiving vitamin D and calcium supplements, half of the patients were randomly given 60 mg of denosumab while the other half were given a placebo. Patients given denosumab had an increase in lumbar spine bone mineral density, a decrease in bone turnover markers, with no significant change in survival rates.

NCT00321464 was another phase III RCT. Similar to NCT00321620 (prostate), this trial measured the safety and efficacy of denosumab versus zoledronic acid. Both groups showed similar survival rates and adverse event frequency.

Multiple myeloma 
Patients whom are diagnosed with multiple myeloma have approximately 80-100% chance of developing bone complications due to an increase in activity and/or formation of osteoclasts and a decrease activity of osteoblasts. In a stage II clinical trial, denosumab decreased bone turnover markers by blocking the RANKL/RANK pathway. Once this trial was completed, 1176 patients with either multiple myeloma or progressed cancers were entered into the stage III clinical trial (known as NCT00330759). The main objective of the NCT00330759 trial was to compare effects of patients who were given 120 mg of denosumab relative to patients give 4 mg of zoledronic acid. As a result of this trial, during a month period, patients who received denosumab had a decrease in pathological fractures and spinal cord compression; however, as time progressed it appear that denosumab had significantly delayed bone complications. In both breast and prostate cancers, patients in either denosumab or zoledronic acid groups both appeared to have comparable adverse events and survival rates.

Medroxyprogesterone acetate 

Women with menopause have often been given various types of postmenopausal hormone therapies to prevent osteoporosis and reduce menopausal symptoms. Medroxyprogesterone acetate (MPA) is a synthetic progestin and was commonly used as a contraceptive or used as a hormone therapy for endometriosis or osteoporosis. Recent studies suggest, using MPA increases patient risks of developing breast cancer due to an increase expression of RANKL. MPA causes a substantial induction of RANKL in mammary-gland epithelial cells while deletion of RANKL decreases the incidence MPA-induced breast cancer. Hence inhibition of RANKL has potential for the prevention and treatment of breast cancer.

See also
 Cluster of differentiation
 RANK
 Osteoprotegerin
 Osteoimmunology

References

Further reading

 link

External links
 RANKL Signaling Pathway
 
 

Cytokines
Clusters of differentiation